Guldbollen (Golden Ball) is a Swedish football award given by Aftonbladet and the Swedish Football Association to the best male Swedish footballer each year.

History

The award was created by Bengt Liljedahl and between 1946 to 1965 it was awarded in cooperation with Stockholms-Tidningen.

The first Guldbollen award was given in 1946 to Gunnar Gren. In 1973, Bo Larsson of Malmö FF became the first player to win the award for a second time, having previously won it in 1965. Zlatan Ibrahimović is the only player to win the award more than twice, winning it twelve times between 2005 and 2020. 

The female equivalent of the award, Diamantbollen, was established in 1990. Both Guldbollen and Diamantbollen are now awarded at the Fotbollsgalan.

Winners

Source:

By club

References

External links

1946 establishments in Sweden
European football trophies and awards
Awards established in 1946
Football in Sweden
Swedish sports trophies and awards
Annual events in Sweden